Sándor Farkas (born 18 September 1953) is a Hungarian politician, member of the National Assembly (MP) for Szentes (Csongrád County Constituency V then III) since 2010. He also represented his hometown between 1998 and 2006. He was a Member of Parliament from Csongrád County Regional List from 2006 to 2010.

He joined Fidesz in 1993. Farkas is a member of the Committee on Agriculture since 1998. He was elected President of the Association of Hungarian Livestock Farmers on 3 March 2016. He was appointed Parliamentary Secretary of State for Agriculture on 22 May 2018.

Personal life
He is married. His wife is Katalin Farkasné Márton. They have two children.

References

1953 births
Living people
Fidesz politicians
Members of the National Assembly of Hungary (1998–2002)
Members of the National Assembly of Hungary (2002–2006)
Members of the National Assembly of Hungary (2006–2010)
Members of the National Assembly of Hungary (2010–2014)
Members of the National Assembly of Hungary (2014–2018)
Members of the National Assembly of Hungary (2018–2022)
Members of the National Assembly of Hungary (2022–2026)
People from Szentes